Hugo Marti (1893–1937) was a Swiss Germanist, writer and literary editor.

Life and work 
Hugo Marti grew up in Basel, Liestal and Bern.   Initially he studied law, but in 1914 switched to German studies (literature and linguistics).   His studies were several times interrupted by periods spent in Norway and Romania where he supported himself by working as a home tutor.  He eventually obtained his doctorate from the University of Bern in 1921 with a dissertation on the language used in the Swiss Civil Code.

His first job after this was on the iconic Pestalozzi-Kalender, a diary/agenda published annually for school children.   In 1922 he was appointed to a Literary editorship with Der Bund, a daily national newspaper published in Bern.   Here many of his more satirical contributions appeared under the pseudonym, "Bepp":  Bepp's true identity became known only after the writer's death.   As literary editor he was supportive of younger authors such as Friedrich Glauser and Kurt Guggenheim, and acted as a counter-weight to the famously conservative "Literature Pope", Otto von Greyerz

Marti died at Davos, then well known as a health resort, in his 44th year from tuberculosis, with which he had been diagnosed in 1928.   He had written about his treatment for the disease in his "Davoser Stundenbuch".

Published output 
Beiträge zu einem vergleichenden Wörterbuch der deutschen Rechtssprache, auf Grund des Schweizerischen Zivilgesetzbuches. Paul Haupt, Bern 1921
Wortregister zum Schweizerischen Zivilgesetzbuch. Haupt, Bern 1922
Das Haus am Haff. Erzählung. Rhein-Verlag, Basel 1922
Das Kirchlein zu den sieben Wundern Legenden. Rhein, Basel 1922
Balder. Sieben Nächte. Rhein, Basel 1923
Der Kelch. Gedichte. Rhein, Basel 1925
Jahresring. Ein poetischer Roman voll Nordlandzauber. Rhein, Basel 1925
Rumänisches Intermezzo. Buch der Erinnerung. Francke, Bern 1926
Rumänische Mädchen. Zwei Novellen. Francke, Bern 1928
Notizblätter von Bepp. Francke, Bern 1928 (zweite Folge 19??; dritte Folge 1942)
Neuausgabe v. Elsa Marti im Selbstverlag: Bern 1969
Die Herberge am Fluss. Ein Spiel (ill. v. Fritz Pauli). Benteli, Bümpliz 1932
Die Universität Bern. Lindner, Küssnacht am Rigi 1932
Die Hundertjahrfeier der Universität Bern. Ein Bericht. Haupt, Bern 1934
Davoser Stundenbuch. Francke, Bern 1935
Rudolf von Tavel. Leben und Werk. Francke, Bern 1935; 4. A. Cosmos, Muri 1984, 
Eine Kindheit. Francke, Bern 1936; Gute Schriften (Band 323), Bern 1968
Der Jahrmarkt im Städtlein. Gute Schriften (Band 187), Bern/Basel 1937

Posthumously published 
Im Zeichen der Freundschaft (mit Lucian Blaga). Kriterion, Bukarest 1985
Das Haus am Haff. Davoser Stundenbuch. Neu hg. v. Charles Linsmayer. Ex Libris, Zürich 1981
"Die Tage sind mir wie ein Traum". Das erzählerische Werk. Hg. v. Charles Linsmayer. Huber, Frauenfeld 2004,

External links 
 

Texte zu Hugo Marti von Charles Linsmayer
Nachlassinventar im Schweizerischen Literaturarchiv

Notes and sources

1893 births
1937 deaths
Writers from Basel-Stadt
Swiss male novelists
20th-century Swiss novelists
20th-century male writers